The Falcon LS is a two-seat, low wing, light sport aircraft originally produced by Corvus Aircraft in Hungary as the Corvus Phantom and imported into the US by T&T Aviation between 2008–2010 and by Renegade Light Sport 2010–present.

There is disagreement between Corvus Aircraft and Renegade Light Sport as to whether the design has been licensed or reverse engineered.

Design and development
On 6 October 2010 the Falcon LS became the first airplane to fly with the Lycoming IO-233-LSA engine. Originally T&T Aviation was selected by Lycoming to help develop their IO-233-LSA engine. When Renegade bought out T&T Aviation they continued the engine development partnership with Lycoming. The IO-233-LSA produces  when equipped with a carburetor and a Champion electronic ignition system.  Renegade installed a capacitor discharge ignition, fuel injection, and a "Vetterman" cross-flow exhaust system to achieve .

T&T Aviation demonstrated 1.5 revolution spins, loops, and barrel rolls in the Falcon LS. Renegade plans a bigger baggage compartment.

Operational history
In March 2017 there were seven Falcon LS aircraft registered with the Federal Aviation Administration in the USA.

Variants
Falcon LS
Light-sport aircraft imported by T&T Aviation. Available only with tricycle gear.
Falcon LS 2.0 Mizzoura
Light-sport aircraft manufactured by Renegade Light Sport in partnership with Corvus and equipped with the Lycoming IO-233-LSA powerplant and a new wing design. Available with either taildragger or tricycle gear and can be converted back and forth in one hour.
Falcon T
Introduced at the 2012 Sebring US Sport Aviation Expo, the aircraft has conventional landing gear ("T" indicates "Taildragger") and is flown from the right seat. Capable of light aerobatics but not approved for it under LSA rules. Is available with an optional "shark mouth" P-40 paint scheme reminiscent of a Curtiss P-40 Warhawk.

Specifications (Falcon LS 2.0)

References

External links
 

Light-sport aircraft
Single-engined tractor aircraft
Low-wing aircraft